The 2018 season was the Atlanta Falcons' 53rd in the National Football League, their second playing their home games at Mercedes-Benz Stadium (the venue for Super Bowl LIII) and their fourth under head coach Dan Quinn. The Falcons  attempted to be the first team to play the Super Bowl in their home stadium as an expected Super Bowl contender. However, the Falcons were riddled with injuries, losing 7 starters to IR with the Falcons stumbling to a 1–4 start.

Following a 31–17 loss to the Saints in Week 12, the Falcons fell to 4–7 and failed to match their 10–6 campaign from 2017. With a 34–20 loss to the Green Bay Packers, the Falcons fell to 4–9 and suffered their first losing season since the 2014 season. Despite beating the Arizona Cardinals 40–14 in Week 15, the Falcons were eliminated from playoff contention for the first time since 2015 with a win by the Minnesota Vikings. However, they were able to end their season with a 3 game win streak to finish 7–9.

Roster changes

Free agents

Unrestricted

Draft

Draft trades
The Falcons traded their fifth-round selection (163rd overall) to Denver in exchange for offensive tackle Ty Sambrailo.
The Falcons were awarded a seventh-round compensatory pick (256th overall).
The Falcons traded both of their seventh-round selections (244th and 256th overall) to Los Angeles in exchange for the Rams' sixth-round selection (194th overall).

Staff

Final roster

Preseason
The Falcons' preseason opponents and schedule was announced on April 11.

Regular season

Schedule

Note: Intra-division opponents are in bold text.

Game summaries

Week 1: at Philadelphia Eagles
NFL Kickoff Game

Week 2: vs. Carolina Panthers

Week 3: vs. New Orleans Saints
{{Americanfootballbox
|titlestyle=;text-align:center;
|state=autocollapse
|title=Week Three: New Orleans Saints at Atlanta Falcons – Game summary
|date=September 23
|time=1:00 p.m. EDT
|road=Saints
|R1=7|R2=9|R3=7|R4=14|R5=6
|home=Falcons
|H1=7|H2=7|H3=7|H4=16|H5=0
|stadium=Mercedes-Benz Stadium, Atlanta, Georgia
|attendance=74,457
|weather=Played indoors (retractable roof closed)
|referee=Walt Anderson
|TV=Fox
|TVAnnouncers=Sam Rosen, Cris Carter and Sara Walsh
|reference=Recap, Gamebook
|scoring=
First quarter
 NO – Ted Ginn Jr. 4-yard pass from Drew Brees (Wil Lutz kick), 11:45. Saints 7–0. Drive: 6 plays, 75 yards, 3:15.
 ATL – Calvin Ridley 18-yard pass from Matt Ryan (Matt Bryant kick), 2:45. Tied 7–7. Drive: 12 plays, 81 yards, 6:06.
Second quarter
 NO – Wil Lutz 49-yard field goal, 9:37. Saints 10–7. Drive: 6 plays, 31 yards, 2:21.
 NO – Wil Lutz 21-yard field goal, 3:06. Saints 13–7. Drive: 8 plays, 70 yards, 4:46.
 ATL – Calvin Ridley 75-yard pass from Matt Ryan (Matt Bryant kick), 2:12. Falcons 14–13. Drive: 2 plays, 75 yards, 0:54.
 NO – Wil Lutz 45-yard field goal, 0:06. Saints 16–14. Drive: 3 plays, 31 yards, 0:34.
Third quarter
 ATL – Calvin Ridley 9-yard pass from Matt Ryan (Matt Bryant kick), 12:00. Falcons 21–16. Drive: 6 plays, 75 yards, 3:00.
 NO – Cameron Meredith 11-yard pass from Drew Brees (Wil Lutz kick), 6:07. Saints 23–21. Drive: 4 plays, 16 yards, 2:29.
Fourth quarter ATL – Tevin Coleman 5-yard pass from Matt Ryan (Matt Ryan-Austin Hooper pass), 14:11. Falcons 29–23. Drive: 12 plays, 82 yards, 6:56.'' NO – Zach Line 1-yard pass from Drew Brees (Wil Lutz kick), 9:59. Saints 30–29. Drive: 8 plays, 75 yards, 4:12.
 ATL – Mohamed Sanu 5-yard pass from Matt Ryan (Matt Ryan-Mohamed Sanu pass), 6:56. Falcons 37–30. Drive: 5 plays, 75 yards, 3:01.
 NO – Drew Brees 7-yard run (Wil Lutz kick), 1:15. Tied 37–37. Drive: 11 plays, 81 yards, 5:43.Overtime NO – Drew Brees 1-yard run, 2:55. Saints 43–37. Drive: 15 plays, 80 yards, 7:05.
|stats=Top passers NO – Drew Brees – 39/49, 396 yards, 3 TD
 ATL – Matt Ryan – 26/35, 374 yards, 5 TDTop rushers NO – Alvin Kamara – 16 carries, 66 yards
 ATL – Tevin Coleman – 15 carries, 33 yardsTop receivers NO – Alvin Kamara – 15 receptions, 124 yards
 ATL – Calvin Ridley – 7 receptions, 146 yards, 3 TD
}}

Week 4: vs. Cincinnati Bengals

Week 5: at Pittsburgh Steelers

Week 6: vs. Tampa Bay Buccaneers

Week 7: vs. New York Giants

Week 9: at Washington Redskins

Week 10: at Cleveland Browns

Week 11: vs. Dallas Cowboys

Week 12: at New Orleans SaintsNFL on Thanksgiving Day'''

Week 13: vs. Baltimore Ravens

The Falcons were the only NFC South team to lose to all of their AFC North opponents in 2018.

Week 14: at Green Bay Packers
Matt Ryan eclipsed 4,000 yards, becoming the third quarterback in NFL history to reach 4,000 in at least eight consecutive seasons, joining Drew Brees (2006-2017) & Peyton Manning (2006-2014). Julio Jones eclipsed 1,400 yards and became the first player in NFL history to register five consecutive seasons with at least 1,400 yards.

Week 15: vs. Arizona Cardinals

Despite this win, the loss by Miami to Minnesota eliminated the Falcons from post-season contention and once again assures that the Super Bowl host team will not play the championship game on their own field.

Week 16: at Carolina Panthers

Week 17: at Tampa Bay Buccaneers

Standings

Division

Conference

References

External links
 

Atlanta
Atlanta Falcons seasons
Atlanta Falcons